Monte Walsh may refer to:

Monte Walsh (1970 film), starring Lee Marvin, Jeanne Moreau, and Jack Palance
Monte Walsh (2003 film), a remake of the earlier movie, starring Tom Selleck, Isabella Rossellini, and Keith Carradine